Ilima or ʻIlima may refer to:

Ilima (ward), administrative ward in Tanzania
Sida fallax, a plant native to Hawaiʻi, the island flower of Oʻahu